Seldek, formerly known as Seldik, is a village in the municipal area of Halfeti, in the province of Urfa, south-eastern Turkey.  The population is 1,588 (in 2018). The village is situated about 2 miles east of the town of Old Halfeti, which lies on the river Euphrates (partially submerged by the reservoir behind the Birecik Dam).

The population of the village has been consistently declining in recent years, falling from 2,523 (in 2007) to 1,588 in ten years.

The name of the village is Kurdish, derived from the personal name Salman. It is attested as Seldik in 1915 and 1928, but is now named Seldek.

About a mile north-west of the village lies an historic mound or tumulus (Höyüktepe Höyüğü). This was declared a 1st Degree Archaeological Site in 2017 by the Şanliurfa Cultural Assets Protection Board.

The village, with the immediate surroundings, including the tumulus, is constituted a Mahallah (mahalle in Turkish), headed by a Mukhtar, currently Cengiz Büyüertaş (2019).

References 

Villages in Şanlıurfa Province